The 1984 United States presidential election in Texas took place on November 6, 1984. All fifty states and the District of Columbia, were part of the 1984 United States presidential election. Texas voters chose 29 electors to the Electoral College, which selected the president and vice president of the United States.

Texas was won by incumbent United States President Ronald Reagan of California, who was running against former Vice President Walter Mondale of Minnesota. Reagan ran for a second time with incumbent Vice President and former C.I.A. Director George H. W. Bush of Texas, and Mondale ran with Representative Geraldine Ferraro of New York, the first major female candidate for the vice presidency.

Reagan carried Texas by a landslide margin of 27.5%; his 63.61% vote share made it his thirteenth-best state, and his second-best amongst states of the Old Confederacy, states that had voted for Carter in 1976, and states with at least 10 electoral votes (in each case, after Florida). Reagan performed strongly in the state's population centers; the state's three largest counties--Harris, Dallas, and Tarrant—had all become Republican strongholds in the state by this time (Ford carried all three while losing the state in 1976), and all gave Reagan over 60% of the vote. However, he also won the swing county of Bexar (San Antonio), which had voted for Carter in 1976, by double digits; and he flipped typically Democratic Travis County (Austin), whose last two Republican votes had been in 1972 and 1956, winning it, too, by double digits.

Unlike in Florida—another rapidly growing Southern state that was beginning to develop a pronounced Republican lean—however, Mondale did retain some strength in some of the rural areas of the Lone Star State. Much of this strength was in the Rio Grande Valley. However, Mondale also carried a handful of the rural, largely white and Protestant counties '[lying] away from the Mexican border' that Democrats up to that point typically could not win Texas without. Mondale carried a handful of counties in East Texas, for example, of which two (Orange and Newton) had voted for George Wallace in 1968. He also retained a handful of ancestrally Democratic counties in West Texas, in or directly south of the Panhandle. In a series of other rural counties which had voted for Carter twice, Mondale kept the margins narrow, such as in Jasper (which had also voted for Wallace), Fannin, and Waller (to name the largest ones).

This made Texas a slightly more competitive state than Florida going into the 1988 election, in contrast with the first six elections of the 21st century, in which Florida has routinely been accounted a swing state and Texas, a safe red state. It wasn't until 2000 that Democratic strength in rural areas of the state away from the Mexican border would finally collapse.

The election was very partisan, with nearly all of the electorate voting for either the Democratic or Republican parties, and only three candidates formally appearing on the ballot. Every county gave either Reagan or Mondale an outright majority. Reagan's best county was Hansford County, where he got 89.4%; Mondale's was Zavala, which gave him 75.9%. Mondale carried only 26 of Texas' 254 counties.

Texas weighed in for this election as five points more Republican than the national average. , this is the last time El Paso County voted for a Republican presidential candidate.

Results

Results by county

See also
 United States presidential elections in Texas
 Presidency of Ronald Reagan

References

Texas
1984
1984 Texas elections